Splendrillia compta is a species of sea snail, a marine gastropod mollusk in the family Drilliidae.

Description
The length of the shell varies between 10 mm and 13 mm.

Distribution
This marine species occurs in the Atlantic Ocean off Rio Grande do Norte, Brazil

References

 Fallon P.J. (2016). Taxonomic review of tropical western Atlantic shallow water Drilliidae (Mollusca: Gastropoda: Conoidea) including descriptions of 100 new species. Zootaxa. 4090(1): 1–363

External links
 

compta
Gastropods described in 2016